The Andainette is a river in the department of Orne, in the Normandy region, France. It is a left tributary of the Varenne, thus a sub-tributary of the river Loire via the Mayenne and Maine. The valleys of the Andainette and its tributaries are protected as a Natura 2000 site.

References 

Rivers of Orne
Rivers of Normandy
Rivers of France